The FIBA Oceania Championship for Women 1989 was the qualifying tournament of FIBA Oceania for the 1990 FIBA World Championship for Women. Australia won the series 3–0.

Results

External links
 FIBA Archive

FIBA Oceania Championship for Women
Championship
1989 in New Zealand basketball
1989 in Australian basketball
International basketball competitions hosted by Australia
Australia women's national basketball team games
New Zealand women's national basketball team games